John Lyon (3 November 1893 – 1975) was an English professional football forward who played in the Football League for Hull City, Leeds United and New Brighton. He ended his career with a player-manager spell at Prescot, a non-league club with whom he had had a long association.

Personal life 
Lyon's older brother Sam also became a footballer.

Career statistics

Honours 
Mold Town

 Welsh National League (North): 1924–25

References

Sportspeople from Prescot
English footballers
Prescot Cables F.C. players
Association football forwards
English Football League players
Hull City A.F.C. players
1893 births
1975 deaths
Leeds United F.C. players
New Brighton A.F.C. players
English football managers